Kuchkineh (also Romanized as Kūchkīneh and Kūchakīneh; also known as Kūsh Ganeh and Kūshkīneh) is a village in Ab Barik Rural District, in the Central District of Sonqor County, Kermanshah Province, Iran. At the 2006 census, its population was 288, in 79 families.

References 

Populated places in Sonqor County